The East-Central Africa Division (ECD) of Seventh-day Adventists is a sub-entity of the General Conference of Seventh-day Adventists, which oversees the Church's work in portions of Africa, which includes the nations of Djibouti, Eritrea, Somalia, Ethiopia, Kenya, Tanzania, Uganda, Rwanda, Burundi, South Sudan and the Democratic Republic of the Congo. Its was founded in 2003 and has its headquarters is in Nairobi, Kenya. Founded in 2003. The Division membership as of June 30, 2021 is 4,588,423.

Sub Fields
The East-Central African Division is divided into three Union Conferences, eight Union Missions, one attached Mission and one attached Territory.  These are divided into local Conferences, Fields, and Missions.

 Burundi Union Mission
 East Burundi Field
 North Burundi Field
 North-West Burundi Field
 South-West Burundi Field
 East Congo Union Mission
 East Kasai Field
 East Katanga Mission
 North Katanga Field
 South Katanga Field
 West Katanga Field
 Eastern Ethiopia Union Mission
 Central Ethiopia Field
 North Ethiopia Field
 Northwest Ethiopia Field
 South Central Ethiopia Field
 South East Ethiopia Field
 South Ethiopia Field
 South Green Ethiopia Field
 South Shewa Ethiopia Field
 East Kenya Union Conference 
 Central Kenya Conference 
 Central Rift Valley Conference 
 East Nairobi Field
 Kenya Coast Field 
 Kenya Lake Conference
 North East Kenya Field
 Nyamira Conference 
 Nyamira West Field
 South-East Kenya Field
 South Kenya Conference
 South Nairobi Kajiado Field
 South Rift Valley Field
 North East Congo Union Mission
 Central Kivu Field
 Kibali Ituri Mission
 Maniema Mission
 North Kivu Field
 South Kivu Field
 Upper Congo Field
 Northern Tanzania Union Conference 
 Mara Conference 
 North-East Tanzania Conference 
 Nyanza Gold Belt Field
 South Nyanza Conference
 Tanzania Rift Valley Field
 Western Tanzania Conference
 Rwanda Union Mission
 Central Rwanda Field
 East Central Rwanda Conference
 North Rwanda Conference
 North-East Rwanda Field
 North-West Rwand Field
 South Rwanda Field
 South-East Rwanda Field
 West Rwanda Field
 Southern Tanzania Union Mission 
 Central Tanzania Field
 East-Central Tanzania Conference 
 Lake Taganyika Field
 South East Tanzania Conference 
 Southern Highlands Conference 
 Uganda Union Mission 
 Central Uganda Conference 
 Eastern Uganda Field 
 North Buganda Field
 Northern Uganda Field 
 Rwenzori Field 
 Southwestern Uganda Field 
 West Buganda Field
 Western Uganda Field
 West Congo Union Mission 
 Central Kasai Field 
 Congo Equatorial Field 
 Lower Congo Field 
 West Congo Field 
 West Kasai Field
 Western Ethiopia Union Mission
 South West Ethiopia Field
 West Central Ethiopia Field
 West Ethiopia Conference
 Gambella Field Station
 West Kenya Union Conference 
 Central Nyanza Conference 
 Greater Rift Valley Conference 
 Kenya Lake Conference 
Lake Victoria Field
 North Rift Field
 North West Kenya Conference 
 Ranen Conference 
 Western Kenya Conference
 West Rift Valley Field
 Eritrea Mission Field
 South Sudan Attached Territory
 Eastern Upper Nile Field
 Greater Bahr el Ghazal Field
 Greater Equatoria Field
 North-Central Nile Field

History

See also
Seventh-day Adventist Church
List of Seventh-day Adventist hospitals
List of Seventh-day Adventist secondary schools
List of Seventh-day Adventist colleges and universities

References

East
Adventist organizations established in the 20th century